Innovation skills are practically the types of skills that allow individuals to become innovative in what they do. These are usually a combination of cognitive skills (e.g. the ability to think creatively and critically), behavioural skills (e.g. the ability to solve problems, to manage risk), functional skills (e.g. basic skills such as writing, reading and numeracy) and technical skills (e.g. research techniques, project management, or IT engineering).

Further reading
Bloom B. S. (1956). Taxonomy of Educational Objectives, Handbook I: The Cognitive Domain. New York: David McKay Co Inc. 
Miron, et al. (2004) "Do personal characteristics and cultural values that promote innovation, quality, and efficiency compete or complement each other?". Journal of Organisational Behaviour 25, 175-199.

See also

 Innovation
 Cognitive style
 Behavior
 Skill
 Learning
 Benjamin Bloom

External links
Conference Board of Canada's project on innovation skills
 Australian Government Department of Education, Science, & Technology work on innovation skills
The Partnership for the 21st Century Skills
Kirton's Adaption-Innovation Theory 

Innovation